Emilie Moberg (born 12 July 1991) is a Norwegian road bicycle racer, who currently rides for UCI Women's Continental Team .

She is a former Norwegian national champion in winter triathlon, and competed at the 2012 Summer Olympics in the Women's road race, but finished over the time limit.

Major results

2008
 1st Overall Smaalenene Skoda Petit Prix
 2nd Overall Tønsberg 4-dagers
 2nd Overall Grenland GP
 2nd Overall Kalas Cup/Norgescup Eidsvollrittet
 2nd Overall Trønderfestivalen
 2nd Criterium, National Junior Road Championships
 2nd Cross-country, National Junior Mountain Bike Championships
 National Junior Track Championships
3rd 500m time trial
3rd Individual pursuit
2009
 1st Overall Grenland GP
1st Stages 1 & 2
 2nd Overall Kalas Cup/Norgescup Eidsvollrittet
1st Stage 3
 National Junior Road Championships
3rd Road race
3rd Time trial
2011
 National Road Championships
1st  Criterium
2nd Road race
 1st Stage 5 Trophée d'Or Féminin
 1st Stage 2 Tour Cycliste Féminin International de l'Ardèche
 7th Open de Suède Vårgårda TTT
2012
 National Road Championships
1st  Criterium
7th Road race
 1st Overall Tour of Zhoushan Island I
1st Stage 1
 3rd Cholet Pays de Loire Dames
 7th Overall Tour of Chongming Island
 8th Team time trial, UCI Road World Championships
 9th Open de Suède Vårgårda TTT
 10th Erondegemse Pijl
2013
 3rd Road race, National Road Championships
2014
 4th Tour of Chongming Island World Cup
 National Road Championships
7th Time trial
9th Road race
 8th Overall Tour of Chongming Island
 9th Team time trial, UCI Road World Championships
 9th Open de Suède Vårgårda TTT
2015
 Tour de Feminin-O cenu Českého Švýcarska
1st Stages 2 & 4
 3rd Sparkassen Giro
 4th Road race, National Road Championships
 4th Acht van Westerveld
 9th Crescent Women World Cup Vårgårda TTT
 10th Team time trial, UCI Road World Championships
2016
 5th Road race, National Road Championships
 5th Overall Ladies Tour of Norway
 6th Team time trial, UCI Road World Championships
 8th Overall Tour of Chongming Island
 10th Madrid Challenge by La Vuelta
2017
 1st Stage 5 Healthy Ageing Tour
 3rd Overall Tour of Zhoushan Island
1st  Points classification
1st Stages 1 & 3
 6th Time trial, National Road Championships
 7th Overall Tour of Chongming Island
2019
 1st Stage 2 Tour of Uppsala
 9th Overall Belgium Tour
2020
 3rd Road race, National Road Championships
2021
 4th Scheldeprijs

References

External links

Norwegian female cyclists
1991 births
Living people
Olympic cyclists of Norway
Cyclists at the 2012 Summer Olympics
People from Halden
European Games competitors for Norway
Cyclists at the 2019 European Games
Sportspeople from Viken (county)
21st-century Norwegian women